Ramendra Kumar Yadav  also called Ravi was an Indian politician. He was a Member of Parliament, representing Bihar in the Rajya Sabha the upper house of India's Parliament.

References

External links
 Official biographical sketch in Parliament of India website

1943 births
2021 deaths
Rajya Sabha members from Bihar
Lok Sabha members from Bihar
India MPs 1989–1991
Rashtriya Janata Dal politicians
Janata Dal politicians
People from Madhepura district